Philip Bernard may refer to:

Philip Bernard (Micmac chief) ( 1786)
Philip Bernard (MP) for Great Yarmouth

See also